Leonid Semyonoviсh Kanevski (2 May 1939, Kyiv, Ukrainian SSR USSR)  is a Soviet, Russian and Israeli actor. He became popular with the Soviet audience after starring in  The Investigation Is Conducted by ZnaToKi detective series where he appeared as major Tomin.

Filmography

 1963 — Forty Minutes Before Dawn — Store manager in a village general store
 1965 — City of Masters — Head of the secret police
 1967 — The Life and Ascension of Yuras Bratchik — A henchman of the cardinal, posing as a blind beggar
 1967 — Two Hours Earlier — Ensemble administrator
 1968 — Spring on the Oder — Intelligence officer Oganesyan
 1968 — Smile to Your Neighbor — House Manager
 1968 — The Punisher — Mr. Andreas
 1968 — The Diamond Arm — Contrabandist, put in plaster
 1969 — The Red Tent — Italian Radio Operator
 1969 — Every Evening at Eleven — Saxophonist
 1969 — Abduction — Director
 1969 — Commandant Lauterburg — Collins
 1970 — Amazing Boy — Boxer Uppercut
 1971 — 2003 — The Investigation Is Conducted by ZnaToKi — Tomin
 1972 — Train Stop — Two Minutes — Krasovsky
 1972 — So the Summer Has Passed
 1974 — Adventures in a City that does not Exist — Captain Bonaventure
 1978 — d'Artagnan and Three Musketeers
 1982 — Along Unknown Paths — Desyatnik Millionskiy
 1983 — Mary Poppins, Goodbye — as Bob Goodetty
 1984 — Pippi Longstocking
 1990 — Death in the Cinema
 2001 — Late Marriage
 2005 — Poor Relatives
 2008 — Photographer
 2009 — Semin
 2010 — Between the Lines — Efim (Fima) Melnik
 2011 — Semin. Retribution —Boris Petrovich Semin, Police colonel, Head of Department (main role)
2011 — Cars 2 — Finn McMissile (Russian version)
 2012 — Welcome and … Our Condolences — as himself (outro gag)
 2017 — Purely Moscow Murders —Grigory
 2017 — Hotel of Happy Hearts — Aron Moiseevich, Pawnshop Owner
 2018 — What Men Talk About. Continuation — Semyon, Lesha's Father
 2019 — Women's Version. The Secret of the Party Dacha — Boris Semyonovich Bystrykh, Member of the Central Committee of the CPSU, father of Svetlana

TV
Kanevsky is the host and main person behind the NTV crime documentary series The investigation led by... (2006–).

References

External links

 

1939 births
Living people
Ukrainian Jews
Actors from Kyiv
Soviet male film actors
Soviet male television actors
Russian male film actors
Russian male television actors
Russian television presenters
Russian emigrants to Israel
Israeli male film actors
Israeli male television actors
Honored Artists of the RSFSR
Soviet Jews
Jewish male actors
Jewish Russian actors